Holy Trinity High School is a Catholic secondary school founded in Chicago, Illinois, United States, by the Congregation of Holy Cross in 1910.  It is located in the Roman Catholic Archdiocese of Chicago.

Established in 1910 by the Brothers of Holy Cross, Holy Trinity was originally a boys' school serving the neighborhood sons of Polish immigrants. Today, Holy Trinity is co-educational and serves Hispanic, African American, Caucasian, and Asian students.  Holy Trinity is centrally located to the Chicago area and attracts students from more than 50 ZIP codes across the city as well as around the world, through its international program.

Academics
Holy Trinity offers a rigorous, college preparatory curriculum. From the B-STEM Honors program to a growing list of AP and college dual credit courses, the school provide a curriculum that prepares students for college-level courses. In fall 2018, Holy Trinity introduced a one-to-one technology plan that equips students with Chromebook touch-screen laptops. The school also has a Resource Learning Center and tutoring program that helps develop strong study habits, effective time management, and problem-solving skills.

The school partners with a number of colleges and universities to provide academic resources to the school community, including:

Benedictine University: Dual-Credit Program
·Northwestern University: Design Thinking Workshops & GoKidney Sci-High Summer Program
·Loyola University: Professional development
·University of Notre Dame: Introduction to Engineering Program, Alliance for Catholic Education
·Smith College: Summer Science and Engineering Program
·Illinois Institute of Technology: NxtGen High School Summer Program
·Malcolm X College: Pre-College Health Science Scholars Summer Program (PCHSS)

Extracurricular activities
The school has over 30 clubs students can join, including Student Government, Pet Club, the Black Student Union, Poetry Club, and the Robotics Team.

References

External links
 Holy Trinity High School

Catholic schools in Chicago
Holy Cross secondary schools
Educational institutions established in 1910
Private high schools in Chicago
Catholic secondary schools in Illinois
1910 establishments in Illinois